Lawrence J. Lee (November 4, 1932 in St. Louis, Missouri - 1991) is an American politician who served in the Missouri Senate. In 1964, he was appointed prosecuting attorney of St. Louis. On November 8, 1966, Lee was elected to the Missouri Senate in a special election, where he rose to the position of majority floor leader.  He died in 1991.

References

1932 births
1991 deaths
Democratic Party Missouri state senators
20th-century American politicians